Angie Tribeca is an American sitcom created by Steve and Nancy Carell, which aired on TBS. The series, a parody of the police procedural genre, stars Rashida Jones as police detective Angie Tribeca. It also stars Hayes MacArthur, Jere Burns, Deon Cole and Andrée Vermeulen in supporting roles.

The first season of Angie Tribeca premiered on January 17–18, 2016, the second season premiered on June 6 of that year, and the third season premiered on April 10, 2017. The fourth and final season was released in its entirety across December 29 and December 30, 2018.

On May 9, 2019, the series was cancelled after four seasons.

Plot 
Angie Tribeca is a 10-year veteran of the Los Angeles Police Department's elite RHCU (Really Heinous Crimes Unit), who is assigned a new partner. The format of each episode involves a different criminal case for the LAPD to solve. The show features nonstop witty one liners, jokes, visual humor, and irony.

Development and production
The series was announced by TBS in mid-2014 with a ten-episode order.  It was promoted as "...a hilarious spoof of police procedurals in the spirit of Police Squad!. A few gags presented in the preview reel were cited as similar to the TV cop show satire Sledge Hammer!.

Originally intended to premiere in late 2015, in November 2015 it was announced that the first season of ten episodes would run uninterrupted on the network and be released through video on demand starting on January 17, 2016.  All 10 episodes of season 1 premiered during a 25-hour TV marathon on January 17–18, 2016.

A second season of an additional ten episodes premiered on June 6, 2016. On July 6, 2016, TBS renewed the series for a third season, which premiered on April 10, 2017. The fourth season, which premiered on December 29, 2018, added Bobby Cannavale to the cast.

Cast

Main cast
 Rashida Jones as Det. Angela "Angie" Tribeca
 Hayes MacArthur as Det./Lt. Jason "Jay" Geils (seasons 1–3)
 Jere Burns as Lt./Capt. Pritikin "Chet" Atkins, Angie's boss
 Burns also plays Eric Atkins, Lt. Atkins' identical twin brother; Capt. Gumbo Atkins, Atkins' Cajun cousin in New Orleans; Lt. Paddy Atkins, Atkins' Irish cousin in New York
 Deon Cole as Det. Daniel "DJ" Tanner (seasons 1–3; guest star: season 4)
Andrée Vermeulen as Dr. Monica Scholls, the medical examiner
 Kiersey Clemons as Maria Charo, the psychiatrist (season 4)
 Bobby Cannavale as Angela "AJ" Geils, Jr., Angie and Jay's son (season 4)

Recurring cast
 Jagger as Det. David Hoffman, Tanner's canine partner
 Alfred Molina as Dr. Edelweiss, the expert scientist (Uncredited)
 Andreas Wigand as Screaming Cop Dave (Season 1)
 Dillon Paigen as Vomiting Cop (Season 1)
 Caitlin Kimball as Rookie Cop (Season 2)
 James Franco as Sgt. Eddie Pepper
 Matthew Glave as Mayor/Vice President Joe Perry
 Heather Graham as Agent Diane Duran
 Nancy Carell as Katy Perry, Mayor Perry's wife
 Chris Pine as Dr. Thomas Hornbein 
 Annie Mumolo as Beth Wiedner
 Rob Riggle as Calvin Sniglet/Det. Zachary Fontaine
 Mary McCormack as Abigail Liukin
 Alison Rich as Det. Small
 John Michael Higgins as Dr. Zaius
 Higgins also plays Randy Zaius, Dr. Zaius' identical twin brother
 Michaela Watkins as Melanie Burke
 Peggy Lipton as Peggy Tribeca, Angie's mom
 Chris Kimball as Officer Kyle
 Ren Hanami as Fluga
 Taran Killam as Pierre Cardin

Guest stars

 Gary Cole as Professor Everett ("Pilot")
 Lisa Kudrow as Monica Vivarquar ("Pilot")
 Adam Scott as Surgeon ("The Wedding Planner Did It")
 Gillian Vigman as Jean Naté ("The Wedding Planner Did It")
 Sarah Chalke as Mrs. Parsons ("The Famous Ventriloquist Did It")
 Jeff Dunham as Fisher Price ("The Famous Ventriloquist Did It").
 John Michael Higgins as Randy Zaius / Dr. Zaius ("The Thumb Affair")
 Amy Smart as Stacy ("Commissioner Bigfish")
 David Koechner as Police Commissioner Niles J. Bigfish ("Commissioner Bigfish")
 Kerri Kenney-Silver as Special Agent Laurie Partridge, Fish and Game Division, Rodent Task Force ("Ferret Royale")
 Keegan-Michael Key as Helmut Fröntbüt ("Ferret Royale")
 Bill Murray as Vic Deakins ("Tribeca's Day Off")
 Cecily Strong as Samantha Stevens ("Tribeca's Day Off")
 Laura Bell Bundy as Vivian Tribeca ("Murder in the First Class")
 Gene Simmons as Himself ("Inside Man")
 Danny Trejo as Himself ("Inside Man")
 John Gemberling as Barista ("The One With the Bomb")
 Ryan Hansen as Wilson Phillips ("The One With the Bomb")
 Jon Hamm as McCormick, Geils' partner who was "the best man on the force" but was transferred just as Tribeca awoke from her coma ("Fleas Don't Kill Me")
 Vicki Lewis as Anne Muffet, the dog trainer and murder suspect ("Fleas Don't Kill Me")
 Busy Philipps as Courtney Woodpatch-Newton, anti-whaling activist and murder suspect ("Miso Dead")
 Rhys Darby as Dr. Helm, a forensic scientist and dentist ("Miso Dead")
 Heather Graham as Diane Duran ("You've Got Blackmail", "Boyz II Dead")
 Maya Rudolph as romance novelist Ms Jackie Wilder ("Organ Trail")
 Joey McIntyre as Skylar, member of boyband Boypocalypse Wow ("Boyz II Dead")
 Saul Rubinek as Pfoopa, manager of boyband Boypocalypse Wow ("Boyz II Dead")
 Chris Kirkpatrick as Chad, member of boyband Boypocalypse Wow ("Boyz II Dead")
 Aaron Carter as P.T. Cruiser, member of boyband Boypocalypse Wow, who was murdered ("Boyz II Dead")
 Colton Dunn as Denarius, member of boyband Boypocalypse Wow ("Boyz II Dead")
 Joe Jonas as Detective Green, officer of the LAPD who brings the other detectives coffee and alluded to be the one that should infiltrate boyband Boypocalypse Wow ("Boyz II Dead")
 Graham Rogers as Eric ("Murder Gras")
 Randall Park as Dr. Moreau ("Brockman Turner Overdrive")
 Andrew Bachelor as Aaron McLaren ("Brockman Turner Overdrive")
 Michelle Dockery as Victoria ("Turn Me On, Geils")
 Natalie Portman as Christina Craft ("This Sounds Unbelievable, but CSI: Miami Did It")
 Constance Zimmer as Detective Jessie Goldstein ("Hey, I'm Solvin' Here!")
 Kelly Rohrbach as Laura Ashley ("License to Drill")
 Ana Ortiz as Betty Crocker ("If You See Something, Solve Something")
 Lizzy Caplan as Deirdre ("If You See Something, Solve Something")
 Ernie Hudson as Pete Tribeca ("Germs on Endearment")
 Ed Helms as Dr. Clive Mister ("Germs of Endearment")
 Niecy Nash as Pandora ("Go Get 'Em, Tiger")
 Eliza Coupe as Dr. Autumn Portugal ("The Force Wakes Up")
 Isla Fisher as Lana Bobanna ("Glitch Perfect")
 Dove Cameron as Grace ("Glitch Perfect")
 Jimmy Tatro as Paul Boneson ("Joystick Luck Club")
 Gillian Jacobs as Becky Bunker / Baguette Bardot ("Joystick Luck Club")
 Anjelica Huston as Anna Summour ("Just the Fat Ma’am")
 Jim Rash as Philip Grammbbowski ("Trader Foes")
 Rose Byrne as Norrah Newt ("Trader Foes")
 Tony Cavalero ("Freezing Cold Prestige Drama")
 Gina Torres as Gillian Kayhill ("Behind the Scandalabra")
 Carl Reiner ("Behind the Scandalabra")
 Kathryn Hahn as Susan ("Air Force Two")
 Carol Burnett as President Priscilla Filcox ("Air Force Two")

Episodes

Reception
Angie Tribeca was met with positive reviews from critics. On Rotten Tomatoes, the first season has an approval rating of 89% based on 38 reviews, with an average rating of 7.71/10. The site's critical consensus reads, "Angie Tribecas unique blend of sharp wit and broad humor – and the obvious fun being had by a talented cast – make for a consistent, charmingly absurd spoof of police procedurals." Metacritic gives it a weighted average score of 78 out of 100 based on 15 critics, indicating "generally favorable reviews".

On Rotten Tomatoes, Seasons 2 and 3 each hold an approval rating of 100% based on five reviews.

See also
 Police Squad!, a 1982 comedy television show with the same style of humor
 Sledge Hammer! (1986), a sustained satire of Dirty Harry and other action heroes
 A Touch of Cloth, a similar British comedy (2012–2014)

References

External links 

 
 
 

2016 American television series debuts
2018 American television series endings
2010s American crime television series
2010s American mystery television series
2010s American parody television series
2010s American police comedy television series
2010s American single-camera sitcoms
English-language television shows
Fictional portrayals of the Los Angeles Police Department
TBS (American TV channel) original programming
Television series by Studio T
Television shows set in Los Angeles
Television shows featuring audio description
Television shows scored by Ludwig Göransson